Amala Institute of Medical Sciences is a private medical college near Amalanagar, in Thrissur city, of Kerala state. It is a Christian minority institution established and administered by the Devamatha Province of the Carmelites of Mary Immaculate (CMI), an indigenous religious congregation founded in 1831.

History
Amala was established in 1978 as a nonprofit, charitable institution aimed at treatment and management of Cancer in Thrissur. The institution was formally inaugurated on 25 April 1978 by the then President of India, Neelam Sanjiva Reddy. The hospital complex was situated on the slopes of the Vilangan Hills, spreading over a  campus.

See also
Azeezia Medical College

References

External links

 Official Website

Medical colleges in Thrissur
Colleges affiliated with the Kerala University of Health Sciences
Catholic universities and colleges in India
1978 establishments in Kerala
Private medical colleges in India